Bragdon v. Abbott, 524 U.S. 624 (1998), was a case in which the Supreme Court of the United States held that reproduction does qualify as a major life activity according to the Americans with Disabilities Act of 1990 (ADA).

Background 
Sidney Abbott, after disclosing on a form that she was 'asymptomatic' HIV positive, was refused service from her dentist, Randon Bragdon, to fill a cavity.  Bragdon submitted that he would agree to fill the cavity if he could perform the work in a hospital setting, but that Abbott would have to pay for the expense of being admitted and using the facility.  Abbott sued Bragdon on grounds of discrimination, citing the Americans with Disabilities Act of 1990.  The case was appealed through the court system and eventually was agreed to be heard by the Supreme Court.  Abbott's case was based on the argument that she was a victim of discrimination based on the ADA.  Abbott argued that HIV created a “substantial limitation” to life activities, specifically, reproductive ability.  Bragdon, the defendant, retorted that HIV posed a “direct threat” to his health and safety, but that he was willing to work on Abbott should he be able to take “extra precautions” in a hospital setting.  Federal trial courts, as well as appellate courts ruled in favor of Abbott.

Issue 
The major issues that were heard and decided upon by the Supreme Court included:  whether HIV is a disability and reproduction a major life activity under the ADA.  Accordingly, can a physician refuse or alter care of a patient with HIV without violating portions of the ADA?

Decision  
The United States Supreme Court ruled that reproduction does qualify as a major life activity under the Americans with Disabilities Act (ADA), and that even asymptomatic HIV would qualify Abbott to claim protection under the act.  The Court held that the ADA does not force care-givers to treat those who pose a direct threat and that health care professionals may not be granted deference to their views when serving as a defendant in cases of alleged discrimination.  The holding does not effect a blanket protection under the ADA to all persons with HIV.

Reason 
The Court utilized the Americans with Disabilities Act of 1990, which aimed to eliminate discrimination towards people with disabilities in the workplace, public areas and by government entities.  That includes discrimination towards people with actual disabilities and persons who are regarded or treated as if they have a disability.  Specific to the case, the ADA stipulates that those with disabilities cannot be discriminated against medical treatment. In order to receive protection from the ADA, Abbott was required to show that she had an impairment, and that it substantially limited a major life activity, on which the Court sided with her claim.

See also
 List of United States Supreme Court cases, volume 524
 List of United States Supreme Court cases
 Lists of United States Supreme Court cases by volume

References

External links
 

United States Supreme Court cases
United States disability case law
United States statutory interpretation case law
1998 in United States case law
HIV/AIDS in the United States
United States Supreme Court cases of the Rehnquist Court